The House of the Missing Girls (French: Traquenards; "Traps") is a 1969 French film directed by Jean-François Davy and starring Anna Gaël, Hans Meyer, and Roland Lesaffre. It follows a woman who becomes the moll of a possessive mobster. The film was distributed in the United States by VIP Distributing, who dubbed the film in English and edited the film significantly, releasing it in the United States as The House of the Missing Girls.

Cast
Anna Gaël as Agnès
Hans Meyer as Varen
Roland Lesaffre as Bob
Jean-Claude Charnay as Robinson
Robert Lombard as Georges Corbeaux
Dominique Erlanger as Olga

References

External links

 

1969 films
French drama films
1960s French films